Thames Williamson (1894–1961) was an American writer. He wrote novels and screenplays.

Select Credits
Next Time I Marry (1938)
Mildred Pierce (1945) - uncredited
Cheyenne (1947)
Escape Me Never (1947)
The Last Bandit (1949)
Brimstone (1950)
The Savage Horde (1950)
A Bullet Is Waiting (1954) - film, novel
Taming Sutton's Gal (1957)

References

External links

American male novelists
1894 births
1961 deaths
20th-century American novelists
American male screenwriters
20th-century American male writers
20th-century American screenwriters